, frequently used in the context of "ghost riding the whip" (a "whip" being a vehicle) or simply , is when a person exits their moving vehicle, and dances beside and around it.

American rapper E-40's 2006 song "Tell Me When to Go" produced by Lil Jon brought mainstream attention to "ghost riding". Ghost riding is also another term used for car surfing, and the term is also occasionally used to describe a moving vehicle with no occupant, such as when a car without the hand brake applied starts to roll down an incline. The practice originated in Northern California, specifically the Bay Area.  It gets its name from the fact that while the driver is dancing beside the moving vehicle, it appears that the vehicle is being driven by an invisible driver.

Ghost riding is an activity that has been practiced in the San Francisco Bay Area and Oakland, California for many years, during what are called sideshows. It is thought to have started as a trend around 2006. The popularization of ghost riding a car is a byproduct of popular Bay Area music, and the hyphy subculture in general, additionally it has been suggested ghost riding is a copycat crime popularized by YouTube videos and online social media.

Ghost riding is performed by exiting an automobile while it is left in gear. The automobile's engine runs at idle speed, slowly propelling the car forward. As with car surfing, ghost riding is dangerous and has resulted in deaths in North America.

References

External links

Hazardous motor vehicle activities
Culture in the San Francisco Bay Area
2000s fads and trends
2000s in California